The Wuling Air EV is a battery electric city car manufactured by SAIC-GM-Wuling (SGMW) since 2022. Based on SGMW's Global Small Electric Vehicle (GSEV) platform, the model is the third GSEV model to be marketed under the Wuling brand after the Hongguang Mini EV and the Nano EV.

Overview 
The Air EV was first introduced in Indonesia as the "Wuling EV" on 1 June 2022, before its debut in China on 3 June. For the Indonesian market, the model is assembled from knock-down kits from China at the SGMW Motor Indonesia plant in Cikarang, West Java. Indonesian models went on sale at the 29th Gaikindo Indonesia International Auto Show on 11 August.

In China, it went on sale in December 2022, and is offered in two- and four-seat variants with differing body lengths and wheelbases.

The Air EV was one of the operational vehicles used for the 2022 G20 Bali summit in Bali.

In November 2022, the vehicle was imported by General Motors to Egypt as the Chevrolet Spark EV as ride hailing vehicles during the 2022 United Nations Climate Change Conference.

Sales

References

External links 

 

Air EV
Cars introduced in 2022
Microcars
Hatchbacks
Electric city cars
Rear-wheel-drive vehicles
Cars of China
Production electric cars
Rear-engined vehicles